Madhesi Jana Adhikar Forum, Nepal may refer to several political parties in Nepal:
 Madheshi Jana Adhikar Forum, Nepal
 Madheshi Jana Adhikar Forum, Nepal (Loktantrik)
 Madhesi Janadhikar Forum Madhesh